Escape is a 2012 American mystery thriller film directed by Paul Emami and produced by James Chankin, Chad Hawkins, Michael Scott, and Emami.

Plot 
After the unexpected death of their infant, doctors Paul (C. Thomas Howell) and Kim Jordan (Anora Lyn) decide to leave America and travel to Thailand on a medical mission. While they're adapting to their new life, Paul is kidnapped and taken to an isolated island by human traffickers, who need a doctor to save their wounded leader. Kim is left to find her husband on her own, unable to prove the reason for his disappearance. Paul is imprisoned with Englishman Malcolm Andrews (John Rhys-Davies), who is being held for ransom. The two men quickly discover that their philosophies are polar opposites: Andrews is a highly spiritual man, while Paul is a strict atheist. Paul later learns that he cannot save his kidnappers' leader without modern equipment, to which he has no access. Paul and Andrews decide to plan an escape as their last hope for survival.

Cast 
 C. Thomas Howell as Paul Jordan
 John Rhys-Davies as Malcolm Andrews
 Anora Lyn as Kim Jordan
 Prinya Intachai as Chakan
 Khanchit Chompoos as The Captain
 Chayut Buanar as Rarong
 Wathana Suksongroh as Lek
 Blaize Andres as Louie
 Celicia Arnold as Michelle
 Sahajak Boonthanakit as Dr. Kiet
 Nophand Chantharasorn as Street Boy
 Tanapol Chuksrida as himself
 Noppawong Khamtonwong as Clerk
 Chanicha Shindejanichakul as herself
 Ken Streutker as Steve
 Somprasong Vejasilp as Old Thai Man

Release 
Escape was released on DVD on October 22, 2012.

Reception 
The Dove Foundation called it "a tremendous story of redemption".

References

External links
 
 

2012 films
2010s mystery thriller films
American mystery thriller films
2010s English-language films
2010s American films